Dotnuva Eldership is a Lithuanian eldership, located in a central part of Kėdainiai District Municipality.  

Eldership was created from the Dotnuva selsovet in 1993.

Geography
All the territory is in Nevėžis plain.
 Rivers: Dotnuvėlė, Jaugila, Kruostas, Kačupys;
 Lakes and ponds: Akademija pond, Mantviliškis pond, Urnėžiai pond, Vaidatoniai pond;
 Forests: Krakės-Dotnuva forest;
 Protected areas: Mociūnai forest botanical sanctuary;
 Nature monuments: Ožakmenis stone.

Populated places 
Following settlements are located in the Dontuva Eldership (as for 2011 census):

Towns: Akademija · Dotnuva
Villages: Aušra · Ąžuolaičiai · Beržai · Bokštai · Gėlainiai · Jaunakaimis · Mantviliškis · Naujaberžė · Naujieji Bakainiai · Naujieji Lažai · Noreikiai · Padotnuvys · Piliamantas · Pilioniai · Puodžiai · Ramėnai · Sandzėnai · Siponiai · · Šalčmiriai · Šiaudinė · Šlapaberžė · Urnėžiai · Vainotiškiai · Valinava · Valučiai · Vincgalys · Žemaičiai
Hamlets: Bakšiai · Pupėnai · Stukai · Zacišiai
Railway settlements: Dotnuva GS

References

Elderships in Kėdainiai District Municipality